Camelia Alina Gherasim (née Tecuţă, born 10 November 1971 in Galaţi) is a Romanian long-distance runner. Gherasim competed in the marathon at the 2000 Summer Olympics. She has won a number of road races including the 1996 Paris Marathon, the 2005 Monaco Marathon (2:43:44), and the 2006 California International Marathon (2:34:23).

Doping
Gherasim tested positive for anabolic steroids at the Amsterdam Marathon in 2002 and received a two-year doping ban.

Achievements

References

External links

Alina Tecuta/Gherasim at MarathonInfo

1971 births
Living people
Doping cases in athletics
Romanian sportspeople in doping cases
Romanian female long-distance runners
Olympic athletes of Romania
Athletes (track and field) at the 2000 Summer Olympics
Paris Marathon female winners
Romanian female marathon runners
Universiade medalists in athletics (track and field)
Universiade bronze medalists for Romania